Kshema Bhoomi is a 2010 Sri Lankan Sinhala drama film directed by Vijaya Dharmasri and produced by Tissa Nagodavithana. It stars Jackson Anthony, Palitha Silva and Yashoda Wimaladharma in lead roles along with Vijaya Nandasiri and Sriyantha Mendis. Music composed by Premasiri Khemadasa. It is the 1136th Sri Lankan film in the Sinhala cinema.

Cast
 Asoka Peiris as Bandara
 Palitha Silva
 Jackson Anthony
 Sangeetha Weeraratne
 Yashoda Wimaladharma as Damayanthi
 Vijaya Nandasiri
 Grace Ariyawimal
 Sriyantha Mendis
 Raja Sumanapala
 Jagath Chamila
 G.R Perera as Ralahamy

References

2010 films
2010s Sinhala-language films